Johannes Ludwig (born 14 February 1986) is an Olympic gold medal-winning German luger who has competed since 1996. He won a bronze medal in the Team relay event at the FIL European Luge Championships 2010 in Sigulda. At the 2018 Winter Olympics, held in Pyeongchang, South Korea, Ludwig won the bronze medal in the men's singles luge and the gold in the team relay luge, along with his teammates Natalie Geisenberger, Tobias Wendl, and Tobias Arlt. Then at the 2022 Winter Olympics in Beijing, he won the gold medal in the Men's singles race.

Career
Ludwig's finished 11th in the men's singles event at the 2007 FIL World Luge Championships in Igls, Austria. His best Luge World Cup overall finish was 11th twice (2006-7, 2007-8).

Ludwig failed to qualify for the 2010 Winter Olympics in Vancouver and the 2014 Winter Olympics in Sochi. At the 2018 Winter Olympics, held in Pyeongchang, South Korea, Ludwig won the bronze medal in the men's singles luge. Ludwig's teammate Felix Loch was the defending champion and favourite to win. He was in the lead until his final run, when he made a mistake, finishing in fifth place. Lugwig was also one of the gold-medal winners in the team relay luge, along with his teammates Natalie Geisenberger, Tobias Wendl, and Tobias Arlt. Ludwig said, "The whole story is very special for me; I was fighting, fighting, fighting, and now I made it and get two medals".

Ludwig won his second gold medal at the Olympics by winning the Men's singles event at the 2022 Winter Olympics in Beijing.

Luge results

World Cup

References

External links

1986 births
German male lugers
Living people
Lugers at the 2018 Winter Olympics
Lugers at the 2022 Winter Olympics
Olympic lugers of Germany
Olympic gold medalists for Germany
Olympic bronze medalists for Germany
Olympic medalists in luge
Medalists at the 2018 Winter Olympics
Medalists at the 2022 Winter Olympics
People from Suhl
Sportspeople from Thuringia